John II the Younger (26 March 1584 – 9 August 1635) was the Duke of Zweibrücken from 1604 until 1635.

Life
John was born in Bergzabern in 1584 as the eldest son of John I, Count Palatine of Zweibrücken and his wife, Magdalene of Jülich-Cleves-Berg. He succeeded his father in 1604 and in 1606 he took back possession of the lordship of Bischweiler in Alsace for the House of Wittelsbach from a vassal, Flach von Schwanzenberg. In 1611 he executed his late father's dispositions in favour of his younger brothers, Friedrich Casimir and Johann Casimir, giving them, respectively, the appanages of Landsberg and Neukastell, retaining for his own realm most of Zweibrücken.

From 1610 until 1612 he was the guardian of Frederick V, Elector Palatine. In this function he was briefly the deputy of the Holy Roman Emperor Rudolph II in 1612, and he minted coins with the Imperial two-headed eagle on reverse.

His first wife having died in 1607, he remarried a cousin, daughter of the Elector Palatine at Heidelberg in May and two months later purchased the estate of Birlenbach (Bas-Rhin), which included dependent manors from Eberhard, Count of Ribeaupierre.

John died in 1635 in Metz and is buried alongside other counts/dukes of the house's line, in the crypt of Alexander's Church in Zweibrücken, built in 1493 by his ancestor Alexander, Count Palatine of Zweibrücken.

Family and children
John married Catherine de Rohan (20 June 1578 - 10 May 1607), daughter of René II, Viscount of Rohan on 26 August 1604 and had the following daughter:
Magdalena Catherine (26 April 1607 - 20 January 1648), married to Christian I, Count Palatine of Birkenfeld-Bischweiler
John married Louise Juliana (16 July 1594 - 28 April 1640), daughter of Frederick IV, Elector Palatine, on 13 May 1612 and had the following children:
Elizabeth Louise Juliana (16 July 1613 - 29 March 1667), Abbess of Herford
Catherine Elizabeth Charlotte (11 January 1615 - 21 March 1651), married to Wolfgang Wilhelm, Count Palatine of Neuburg
Frederick (5 April 1616 - 9 July 1661)
Anne Sybille (20 July 1617 - 9 November 1641)
John Louis (22 July 1619 - 15 October 1647)
Juliana Magdalena (23 April 1621 - 25 March 1672), married to Frederick Louis, Count Palatine of Zweibrücken
Maria Amalie (19 October 1622 - 11 June 1641)

Ancestors

References

1584 births
1635 deaths
People from Bad Bergzabern
House of Palatinate-Zweibrücken
House of Wittelsbach
Burials at the Alexanderkirche, Zweibrücken
Counts Palatine of Zweibrücken